Colour Vision may refer to:
 Colour Vision (horse), a Thoroughbred racehorse
 Colour Vision (album), a 2020 album by MAX
 Color vision, the ability to distinguish colours